Kim In-Ho (born 9 June 1983) is a South Korean former football player. He was involved in a match fixing scandal that ended his K-League career. He formerly played for Chunnam Dragons, Jeonbuk Hyundai Motors and Jeju United.

External links 

1983 births
Living people
South Korean footballers
Jeonnam Dragons players
Korean Police FC (Semi-professional) players
Jeonbuk Hyundai Motors players
Jeju United FC players
K League 1 players
Association football defenders